These are the Billboard magazine Hot Dance Club Play number one hits of 1978.

See also
1978 in music
List of number-one dance hits (United States)
List of artists who reached number one on the U.S. Dance chart

References

Some weeks may also be found at Billboard magazine courtesy of Google Books: 1975—1979.

1978
1978 record charts
1978 in American music